Horst-Dieter Höttges (born 10 September 1943) is a German former footballer who played as a defender. Having started his career with hometown club Borussia Mönchengladbach, he spent most of his career with Werder Bremen. At international level, he represented West Germany from 1965 to 1974, amassing 66 caps and scoring 1 goal.

Club career

Borussia Mönchengladbach
Born in Mönchengladbach, Höttges began playing football at local sides Blau-Weiß Bahl and Rheydter SV before joining Borussia Mönchengladbach at the age of 17. After three years in the youth of Mönchengladbach he was taking part for them in their Regionalliga West campaign of 1963–64 with Mönchengladbach manager Hennes Weisweiler feeling Höttges' way of playing was not he was looking for and the defender was forced to move on.

Werder Bremen
Ahead of the 1964–65 season he signed with Bundesliga team Werder Bremen and enjoyed immediate success under Willi Multhaup at the Weser-Stadion, ending up winner of the Bundesliga title with Werder at the end of the same season.

This outstanding success with Werder Bremen was a key for the full back to be called up by Helmut Schön for the German team already in 1965, a time when his toughness in tackling duels earned him his "Eisenfuß" (iron foot) nickname. Although Werder Bremen could not recopy the success of 1965, and became rather a relegation battler than a title chaser, Höttges remained loyal to them and served in the Bundesliga until 1978, scoring 55 goals in his 420 appearances for the North German side. His commitment to a half-a-day employment as sales representative for a manufacturer of sports goods forced him to hang up his boots that summer. Höttges put job before club, unwilling to give up his business, and got named "Ehrenspielführer" (honorary captain) due to his career efforts by Werder Bremen.

Later years
Later on he was showing up for some time on amateur level for Bad Oeynhausen's SC Oberbecksen and TSV Achim, a club in a village near Bremen, where he settled down. He was partly coaching that club in an honorary capacity in the 1990s.

International career
On 13 March 1965, Horst-Dieter Höttges debuted for West Germany in a friendly against Italy (1–1) at Hamburg's Volksparkstadion. Hamburg's Volksparkstadion was also the place where he won the last of his sixty-six caps for West Germany during the memorable first round defeat at the hands of East Germany in the 1974 FIFA World Cup. The defeat of the West Germans in the politically and emotionally exaggerated match lead coach Helmut Schön to significant changes in his line-up and limiting Höttges to a bench role was one of those. It resulted in the defenders subsequent retirement from international football after the 1974 FIFA World Cup final (West) Germany won against their Dutch opponents. His first of altogether three World Cup participations Höttges enjoyed in 1966 as part of the runner-up squad of (West) Germany in England. He was further a member of the squad for the 1970 FIFA World Cup (third-place finish) and was a starter for his country in the UEFA Euro 1972 final against in Brussels on 18 June. He and his teammates beat the Soviet Union that day to win Germany's first UEFA European Football Championship trophy.

References

1943 births
Living people
Sportspeople from Mönchengladbach
Association football defenders
German footballers
West German footballers
Footballers from North Rhine-Westphalia
Germany international footballers
Germany B international footballers
Germany under-21 international footballers
Bundesliga players
Borussia Mönchengladbach players
SV Werder Bremen players
1966 FIFA World Cup players
1970 FIFA World Cup players
1974 FIFA World Cup players
FIFA World Cup-winning players
UEFA Euro 1972 players
UEFA European Championship-winning players